The Richard Starcke House is a historic house located at 703 Main Street, Bastrop, Texas, United States. The house was built in 1913 by Richard Starcke, a prominent Bastrop businessman, for himself and his wife Mary.

The house is a clapboard covered modified American Foursquare design with some Victorian architecture, American Craftsman and Prairie School elements incorporated.

In 1931, Richard died. Mary remained in the home. Upon her death in 1961, the house passed through several owners and, in 1966, into bank foreclosure. The house was purchased at auction by Lt. Col. Johnnie Zinn and Ernestine Moncure Zinn. The house served as the Zinn's home until 1987 and entered the National Register of Historic Places on December 22, 1978.

Carla and Chris Dickson subsequently purchased the house in 1994 and operated "The Colony Bed and Breakfast" until the death of Mrs. Dickson in 2005. Julie Hart and Paula Pate purchased the house in 2007 and reopened it in May, 2008 as the "Magnolia Inn Bed and Breakfast".

See also

National Register of Historic Places listings in Bastrop County, Texas

References

Houses in Bastrop County, Texas
Houses on the National Register of Historic Places in Texas
National Register of Historic Places in Bastrop County, Texas
Houses completed in 1913
1913 establishments in Texas